Bonanza Mountain Estates is an unincorporated community and a census-designated place (CDP) located in and governed by Boulder County, Colorado, United States. The CDP is a part of the Boulder, CO Metropolitan Statistical Area. The population of the Bonanza Mountain Estates CDP was 128 at the United States Census 2010. The Nederland post office (Zip Code 80466) serves the area.

Geography
The CDP is a residential community located in southern Boulder County in the Front Range of the Colorado Rocky Mountains, just east of the town of Nederland. It is situated on a ridge between Middle Boulder Creek and North Boulder Creek. Ridge Road is the main street through the community, leading west to Nederland and east to St. Ann Highlands.

Demographics

See also

Outline of Colorado
Index of Colorado-related articles
State of Colorado
Colorado cities and towns
Colorado census designated places
Colorado counties
Boulder County, Colorado
Colorado metropolitan areas
Front Range Urban Corridor
North Central Colorado Urban Area
Denver-Aurora-Boulder, CO Combined Statistical Area
Boulder, CO Metropolitan Statistical Area

References

External links

Boulder County website

Census-designated places in Boulder County, Colorado
Census-designated places in Colorado
Denver metropolitan area